The Negeri Sembilan order of precedence is a nominal and symbolic hierarchy of important positions within the state of Negeri Sembilan. It has no legal standing but is used to dictate ceremonial protocol at events of a state nature.

Order of precedence 
Order of precedence in Negeri Sembilan is as follows:

See also 
 List of post-nominal letters (Negeri Sembilan)

References 

Orders of precedence in Malaysia
Government of Negeri Sembilan